Quarta is a surname. Notable people with the surname include:

People 
Lucas Martínez Quarta (born 1996), Argentine footballer
Roberto Quarta (born 1949), Italian-American businessman
Nicola Quarta (1927–2020), Italian politician

Characters 
Xenovia Quarta, High School DxD characters

See also